Anderson Martins Pedro, the Anderson Bill, also known as King William, born in the Criciúma is a centre back who plays in the Veranópolis.

Career
Plays in the Grêmio Prudente.

Career statistics
(Correct )

Contract
 Grêmio Prudente.

References

External links
 ogol
 soccerway
 WebSoccerClub

1981 births
Living people
Brazilian footballers
Sociedade Esportiva e Recreativa Caxias do Sul players
Association football central defenders